Vaman Viswanath Kumar , often known as V. V. Kumar (born 26 June 1935) is a former Indian cricketer who played in two Test matches in 1961. On his debut he took five wickets in the first innings against Pakistan in  Delhi in 1961.

See also
 List of India cricketers who have taken five-wicket hauls on Test debut

References

1935 births
Living people
Cricketers from Chennai
India Test cricketers
Indian cricketers
Cricketers who have taken five wickets on Test debut
Tamil Nadu cricketers
South Zone cricketers
State Bank of India cricketers
Indian Starlets cricketers